Pat McCormick may refer to:

Pat McCormick (actor) (1927–2005), appeared in Smokey and the Bandit, wrote for The Tonight Show
Patricia McCormick (author) (born 1956), American journalist and writer of realistic fiction for young adults
Patricia McCormick (bullfighter) (1929–2013)
Pat McCormick (diver) (1930–2023), Olympic gold medalist
Pat McCormick (television personality) (born ), Oakland, California area television weatherman

See also
Patty McCormack (born 1945), stage, film and television actress